Amy C. Rosenzweig is a professor of Chemistry and Molecular Biosciences at Northwestern University. She was born in 1967 in Pittsburgh, Pennsylvania. Her current research interests include structural biology and bioinorganic chemistry, metal uptake and transport, oxygen activation by metalloenzymes, and characterization of membrane protein. For her work, she has been recognized by a number of national and international awards, including the MacArthur "Genius" Award in 2003.

Education and training 
She received her BA in chemistry from Amherst College in 1988, and her Ph.D. from Massachusetts Institute of Technology in 1994. At MIT, Rosenzweig worked under the supervision of Stephen J. Lippard where she pioneered the structural studies of the hydroxylase component of methane monooxygenase from methyloccous capsulatus.

Biological Methane Oxidation

Rosenzweig determined the molecular structures of Nature's main methane oxidation catalysts. Methane monooxygenases (MMO) are metalloenzymes found in the family of methanotrophic bacteria. These enzymes belong in the oxidoreductase class. They activate carbon-hydrogen bonds to selectively install oxygen onto their substrate. Two major species of MMO exist—soluble MMO (sMMO) and particulate MMO (pMMO). Despite mediating the same chemical reaction, these two enzymes' structure and mechanism are significantly different.

Since the early 1990s, Rosenzweig has studied MMO enzymes in various biological systems. Her team was the first to solve the crystal structure of particulate MMO in 1993. In the following years, she made major advances in determining the enzyme's bioactivity and chemical constitution, including vast contributions to research on the metal-coordinated active site.

The currently proposed mechanism for sMMO involves an Iron (II) coordination complex that is twice oxidized to form a metalloperoxide species. This species then undergoes reduction in the presence of substrate methane to afford the oxidized alkyl methanol. The crystal structure of the sMMO protein-protein complex has been determined.

Currently, there remains a mystery in the direct understanding of pMMO-substrate interaction, particularly in diagnosing a complex mechanism. According to Rosenzweig, this elusive problem remains "one of the major unsolved problems in bioinorganic chemistry."

Metal Transport 
In her work with pMMOs, Rosenzweig elucidated the molecular basis for safe handling of potentially toxic metal ions through direct handoff between protein partners. Methanotrophs secrete methanobactin. Methanobactin chelated with high affinity to copper, and forms a complex (CuMbn) that can be reinternalized by the cell through active transport. There are specific interactions between CuMbn and proteins MbnT and MbnE. These findings reveal mechanisms for recognition and transport of CuMbn.

Metalloprotein Function 
Rosenzweig determined structures of important metalloproteins, exerting sustained influence on the field of bioinorganic chemistry. Particular proteins which she determined the structure of are E. coli Mn (II) 2-NrdF and Fe (II) 2-NrdF, which have different coordination sites. This suggests distinct initial binding sites for oxidants during cofactor activation with E. coli and nucleotides.

Awards
 Alfred Bader Award in Bioinorganic or Bioorganic Chemistry Recipient American Chemical Society, 2021 
 Elected Member, National Academy of Sciences, 2017
 Elected Fellow, American Academy of Arts and Sciences, 2014
 Royal Society of Chemistry Joseph Chatt Award, 2014
 Ivano Bertini Award, 2014
 American Chemical Society Nobel Laureate Signature Award for Graduate Education, 2006
 Honorary Degree, Doctor of Science, Amherst College, 2005
 MacArthur Fellow, 2003

Works
Lieberman, R. L & Rosenzweig, A. C. "Crystal structure of a membrane-bound metalloenzyme that catalyses the biological oxidation of methane", Nature 2005, 434, 177-182.
Lieberman, R. L., Kondapalli, K. C., Shrestha, D. B., Hakemian, A. S., Smith, S. M., Telser, J., Kuzelka, J., Gupta, R., Borovik, A. S., Lippard, S. J., Hoffman, B. M., Rosenzweig, A. C., & Stemmler, T. L. "Characterization of the particulate methane monooxygenase metal centers in multiple redox states by X-ray absorption spectroscopy". Inorg. Chem. 2006, 45, 8372-8381.
Sazinsky, M. H., Mandal, A. L, Argüello, J. M., & Rosenzweig, A. C. "Structure of the ATP binding domain from the Archaeglobus fulgidus Cu1+-ATPase". J. Biol. Chem.. 2006, 281, 11161-11166.
Yatsunyk, L. A. & Rosenzweig, A. C. "Copper binding and transfer by the N-terminus of the Wilson disease protein", J. Biol. Chem.. 2007, 282, 8622-8631.
Rosenzweig, Lippard, "Structure and Biochemistry Methane Monooxygenase Enzyme Systems", Transition metals in microbial metabolism, Editors Günther Winkelmann, Carl J. Carrano, CRC Press, 1997, 
Rosenzweig, Feng, Lippard, "Studies of Methane Monooxygenase and Alkane Oxidation Model Complexes", Applications of enzyme biotechnology, Editors Jeffery W. Kelly, Thomas O. Baldwin, Springer, 1991,

References

External links
"Amy Rosenzweig", Faculty of 1000

American women biochemists
Northwestern University faculty
Amherst College alumni
Massachusetts Institute of Technology School of Science alumni
Living people
American women chemists
1967 births
MacArthur Fellows
The Ellis School alumni
American women academics
21st-century American women